Marie Madeleine Berthe Lebeau (10 June 1923 – 1 May 2016) was a French film actress who also appeared in American films, most notably Casablanca.

Early life
Lebeau married actor Marcel Dalio in 1939; it was his second marriage. They had met while performing a play together. She had already appeared in her first film, an uncredited role as a student in the melodrama Young Girls in Trouble (Jeunes filles en détresse, 1939). In June 1940, Lebeau and Dalio (who was Jewish) fled Paris ahead of the invading German Army and reached Lisbon. They are presumed to have received transit visas from Aristides de Sousa Mendes, allowing them to enter Spain and journey on to Portugal. It took them two months to obtain visas to Chile.

However, when their ship, the S.S. Quanza, stopped in Mexico, they were stranded, along with around 200 other passengers, when the Chilean visas they had purchased turned out to be forgeries. Eventually, they were able to get temporary Canadian passports and entered the United States. Lebeau made her Hollywood debut in Hold Back the Dawn (1941), which featured Charles Boyer and Olivia de Havilland in the leading roles. The following year, she appeared in the Errol Flynn movie Gentleman Jim, a biography of Irish-American boxer James J. Corbett.

Lebeau learned English during a seven-week stay with Dalio on a Portuguese freighter that was seeking a port for landing.

Casablanca
Later that year she was cast in the role of Yvonne, Humphrey Bogart's character's discarded mistress, in Casablanca. Warner Bros. signed her to a $100-a-week contract for twenty-six weeks to be in a number of films. On 22 June, while she was filming her scenes in Casablanca, her husband, Marcel Dalio, who played Emil the croupier in the same film, filed for divorce in Los Angeles on the ground of desertion. They divorced in 1942. Shortly before the release of the film, Warner Bros. terminated her contract. After  Joy Page died in April 2008, Lebeau was the last surviving credited cast member of Casablanca.

She told Charlotte Chandler, author of a biography of female lead Ingrid Bergman, in the 1990s: "It wasn't that I was cut out, it was because they kept changing the script, and each time they changed it, I had less of a part". "It was not personal, but I was so disappointed".

Lebeau's best moments in Casablanca are during the scene when French nationals sing "La Marseillaise", drowning out a group of German soldiers singing "Die Wacht am Rhein". The camera captures the (genuine) tears on her face, and later at the end of the anthem when she cries out "Vive la France ! Vive la liberté !" France had fallen to Nazi forces, and many of the actors performing in the scene were real-life refugees from Europe.

After Casablanca
Following Casablanca, Lebeau appeared in two further American films. The first was a large role in the war drama Paris After Dark (1943), with her former husband. The following year, Lebeau had a smaller role in Music for Millions. She appeared on Broadway in the play The French Touch in a production directed by René Clair. After the end of World War II, Lebeau returned to France and continued her acting career. She appeared in Les Chouans (The Royalists, 1947) and worked in Great Britain, appearing in a film with Jean Simmons, Cage of Gold (1950).

Later years
She would appear in 20 more films, mainly French, including La Parisienne (1957), with Brigitte Bardot as the star, as well as in Federico Fellini's 8½ (1963). Lebeau's last two films were Spanish productions in 1965.

In 1988, she married her third husband, Italian screenwriter Tullio Pinelli who had contributed to the script of 8½.

Death
Lebeau died on 1 May 2016 in Estepona, Spain, aged 92, after breaking her thigh bone. French culture minister Audrey Azoulay said of Madelaine Lebeau after her death: "She was a free woman who lived by her own rules, totally inhabiting the roles entrusted to her by leading directors. She will forever be the face of French resistance."

Filmography

References

External links
 
 
 
 

1923 births
2016 deaths
20th-century French actresses
French film actresses
French expatriates in Spain
People from Antony, Hauts-de-Seine
French expatriate actresses in the United States